Johann Gabriel Josef Albert, Marquess of Chasteler and Courcelles (22 January 1763 – 7 May 1825) was a Walloon, born near Mons, Belgium. He entered the military service of Habsburg Austria at an early age and trained as an engineer at the Ingenieurakademie in Vienna. Serving as chief of staff to Spleny in the Turkish War from 1788, he won the Ritterkreuz  (Knight’s Cross) of the Order of Maria Theresa for outstanding bravery at the Battle of Focsani in action against the Ottoman Turks.

Family 
He was born the eldest son of François-Gabriel-Joseph du Chasteler de Courcelles and Albertine, daughter of Johan, Graf von Thürnheim (1742–1765).

French Revolutionary Wars
In the War of the First Coalition against the First French Republic he served as an engineer on the Rhine, distinguishing himself at Mainz in 1795. Promoted to general officer in 1796 he served under the Archduke Charles in Germany.

In 1799 Chasteler was appointed Generalquartiermeister (chief of staff) to Suvorov and commander of a wing of the Austrian army in Italy. Serving at the Battle of Cassano 27 April, he invested Tortona in May, but was wounded at Alessandria, 16 July. Elevated to Commander of the Order of Maria Theresa and made chief of staff in Southern Germany in 1800, he serving at Engen and Mösskirch, before leading a Brigade in the Tyrol, distinguishing himself at the action of Scharnitz.

Napoleonic Wars
At the opening of the War of the Third Coalition, in 1805 he was appointed to lead an advance guard division in the Tyrol, where he successfully covered the retreat of the Archduke John, notably at the Strub Pass.

1809
The Hofkriegsrat appointed Chasteler to lead the VIII Armeekorps in Archduke John's Army of Inner Austria at the beginning of the War of the Fifth Coalition. Immediately, he was detached with 10,000 troops and sent to assist the revolt in the Tyrol and Albert Gyulay took his place as corps commander. On 13 May he was badly beaten at the Battle of Wörgl by Lefebvre's Bavarian VII Corps. Repeatedly prevented from rejoining John's forces his command ended the campaign at Lake Balaton in July. After the peace he was appointed Military Commander of the Austrian Silesia.

1813
In 1813 he commanded the defences of Prague, then commanded a Corps of the Army of Bohemia under Schwarzenberg, serving at Kulm and Tortona 16 May. Nominated Governor of the Theresienstadt Fortifications, after Leipzig he was given the command of Klenau’s Army Corps. 
In 1814 after the establishment of the new Lombardo-Venetian Kingdom, Chasteler was in charge of the Venetian defences.

He was the Proprietor (Inhaber) of an Austrian infantry regiment on three occasions.

Character
Chasteler was regarded as a competent professional, representing "the last generation of the talented and lively southern Netherlanders in the Austrian Army. He was brave as well as expert, but also bespectacled and short-sighted -  an unfortunate combination of characteristics with brought him into the path of many a missile in the course of his career" 
As the commander of an Army Corps in 1809 however his performance was "vacillating".

Notes

References

Printed materials
 Bowden, Scotty & Tarbox, Charlie. Armies on the Danube 1809. Arlington, Texas: Empire Games Press, 1980.
 Schneid, Frederick C. Napoleon's Italian Campaigns: 1805-1815. Westport, Conn.: Praeger Publishers, 2002. 
 Smith, Digby. The Napoleonic Wars Data Book. London: Greenhill, 1998.

External links
 napoleon-series.org Chasteler de Courcelles by Digby Smith, compiled by Leopold Kudrna

Austrian soldiers
Belgian soldiers
Austrian generals
Military leaders of the French Revolutionary Wars
Commanders Cross of the Military Order of Maria Theresa
Austrian Empire military leaders of the French Revolutionary Wars
Austrian Empire commanders of the Napoleonic Wars
Walloon people
1763 births
1825 deaths